Worcestershire is a historic, ceremonial, and (except in the period 1972–1998) administrative county of England. Since 1998 it is classified as a non-metropolitan county.

On 1 April 1995 the Hereford and Worcester and West Midlands (County Boundaries) Order 1993 transferred part of the parish of Frankley (including the remaining south-west part of Bartley Reservoir) from Hereford and Worcester to Birmingham to become part of the West Midlands county.  The area in question becoming the civil parish of New Frankley in 2000.

See also
Evolution of Worcestershire county boundaries
List of boundary changes in the West Midlands (region)

References

Local government in Worcestershire
Worcestershire
History of Worcestershire
Boundary changes